North Higgins Lake State Park is a public recreation area located  west of Roscommon in Beaver Creek Township, Crawford County, Michigan.  The state park occupies  on the north shore of Higgins Lake at the site of what was once one of the world's largest seedling nurseries.

Features

Higgins Lake Nursery and CCC Museum
The Higgins Lake Nursery and CCC Museum documents the role of the Civilian Conservation Corps in Michigan from 1933 to 1942 when more than 100,000 young Michigan men performed a variety of conservation and reforestation efforts. Exhibits tell the story of how the Michigan CCC planted 484 million trees, spent 140,000 days fighting forest fires and constructed 7,000 miles of truck trails, 504 bridges and 222 buildings. The Michigan state park system carries many examples of their work still in use today, including the MacMullan Conference Center.

Ralph A. MacMullan Conference Center

The Ralph A. MacMullen Conference Center Scenic Site (RAM Center) is a lodge and free-standing facility in the park.  Originally built by the Civilian Conservation Corps in the 1930s, it currently serves as a retreat center for nonprofit and public sector groups.  It is located on the northern shores of Higgins Lake, northeast of the village of Roscommon between U.S. Route 127 and Interstate 75.

The MacMullen Center was built in a rustic style with a fieldstone exterior. It has a capacity of 135.

Activities and amenities
Park activities include camping, swimming, fishing, picnicking, and boating. There are eleven miles of trails for hiking and cross-country skiing through state forest land adjacent to the park.

References

External links

North Higgins Lake State Park Michigan Department of Natural Resources
North Higgins Lake State Park Map Michigan Department of Natural Resources
 Michigan Department of Natural Resources
 Ralph A. MacMullen Conference Center

Protected areas of Crawford County, Michigan
State parks of Michigan
Civilian Conservation Corps museums
History museums in Michigan
Civilian Conservation Corps in Michigan
Museums in Crawford County, Michigan
Protected areas established in 1965
1965 establishments in Michigan
IUCN Category III